Light clay (also light straw clay, light clay straw, slipstraw) is a natural building material used to infill between a wooden frame in a timber framed building using a combination of clay and straw, woodchips or some other lighter material.

History
A mixture of clay and straw was used as an infill material for timber framed building from at least the 12th century in Germany and elsewhere in Europe. Renewed interest in traditional building methods developed from the 1980s after which various natural building architects and builders started promoting the use of light clay.

Usage

Local clay, often local subsoil, is mixed into a slurry with water and then combined with straw or wood chip or other similar material. Wood chips can vary in size from sawdust to 5 cm in diameter. The ratio of clay to other ingredients can be adapted to either increase thermal mass or insulation properties. The mixture is provided with additional structural strength using wattles. When used externally it can be protected with a Lime render or a clay render.

See also
 Adobe
 Cob
 Wattle and daub
 Wychert

References

Soil-based building materials
Sustainable building
Appropriate technology
Natural materials
Sustainable products